Mamadou Hady Barry (born 16 May 1986), also known as Hady Barry, is a Guinean-born Indonesian professional footballer who plays as a striker for Liga 2 club Persewar Waropen.

Club career

Persipal Palu
Barry played for Persipal Palu in Indonesia for 5 years before joining Sun Hei.

Sun Hei SC
He joined Sun Hei SC in January 2011. He had his first appearance for Sun Hei SC against Kitchee SC in Hong Kong First Division League, and he scored a goal. On 16 October 2011, Barry became the first player to score a hat-trick at the newly renovated Mong Kok Stadium.

South China
He joined fellow Hong Kong club South China in June 2013 for free. On 1 September 2013, Barry netted a brace on his debut for South China; the match finished 3-2 with South China the victors. He scored 5 goals during his half-season stint with the club, in which 4 of them were from the penalty spot. In December 2013, South China received a berth for the 2014 AFC Champions League qualifying play-off and decided to move on for expatriate players of better quality, hence parted way with Barry.

PSMS Medan
He was signed for PSMS Medan to play in the Liga 2 in the 2021 season. Barry made his debut on 20 October 2021 in a match against PSPS Riau at the Gelora Sriwijaya Stadium, Palembang.

Persewar Waropen
In November 2021, Barry signed a contract with Liga 1 club Persewar Waropen. He made his league debut on 4 November 2021 in a 3–1 win against Kalteng Putra at the Batakan Stadium, Balikpapan. On 24 November 2021, Barry scored his first goal for Persewar against Persiba Balikpapan in the 9th minute at the Batakan Stadium, Balikpapan.

International career
He was called up by Guinea national under-23 football team for the match against Mali U23 in 2012 CAF Men's Pre-Olympic Tournament. He scored a goal in the 84th minute. The match ended 2–2 and Mali won on the away goals rule.

Career statistics

Club

Honours
Sun Hei
 Hong Kong Senior Challenge Shield: 2011–12

References

External links
 Mamadou Barry at HKFA

1986 births
Guinean footballers
Guinean emigrants to Indonesia
Indonesian people of Guinean descent

Hong Kong First Division League players
Sun Hei SC players
Living people
Association football forwards
South China AA players
Terengganu FC players
Naturalised citizens of Indonesia
PSMS Medan players
Persewar Waropen players
Liga 2 (Indonesia) players